Yusuf Abdi Ali "Tukeh" is a Somali former head of the Somali National Army’s Fifth Brigade. In 2019, a US jury found Ali guilty of committing acts of torture during Somalia's civil war in the late 1980s.

In 2022, Ali was arrested by in Springfield, Virginia regarding his war crimes including extrajudicial killing; torture; cruel, inhuman, or degrading treatment or punishment; and arbitrary detention.

References 

Somalian military leaders

Living people
Year of birth missing (living people)
Somali Civil War